German submarine U-170 was a Type IXC/40 U-boat of Nazi Germany's Kriegsmarine built for service during World War II.
Her keel was laid down on 21 May 1941 by the Deutsche Schiff- und Maschinenbau AG in Bremen as yard number 709. She was launched on 6 June 1942 and commissioned on 19 January 1943 with Kapitänleutnant Günther Pfeffer in command.

The U-boat's service began with training as part of the 4th U-boat Flotilla. She then moved to the 10th flotilla on 1 June 1943 for operations. She was reassigned to the 33rd flotilla on 1 November 1944.

Design
German Type IXC/40 submarines were slightly larger than the original Type IXCs. U-170 had a displacement of  when at the surface and  while submerged. She had two shafts and two  propellers.

U-170 was fitted with six  torpedo tubes (four fitted at the bow and two at the stern), 22 torpedoes, one  SK C/32 naval gun, 180 rounds, and a  SK C/30 as well as a  C/30 anti-aircraft gun. The boat had a complement of forty-eight.

Service history

First patrol
U-170s first patrol began with her departure from Kiel on 27 May 1943. Her route took her the long way around the British Isles to the Atlantic Ocean west of the Azores. She had passed through the 'gap' between Iceland and the Faroe Islands. She arrived at Lorient in occupied France on 9 July.

Second patrol
Her second sortie was to the Brazilian coast.

Third patrol
The boat's third foray was to the US east coast. She departed Lorient on 9 February 1944 and returned to the same port on 27 May.

Fourth patrol
Her last patrol was to the waters off West Africa. On the return voyage to Germany, she was attacked by unidentified destroyers west of southern Ireland on 30 October 1944 and was badly damaged. She also reported a damaged Schnorchel (underwater breathing device), on 5 November and docked in Norway for repairs. She arrived at Flensburg on 4 December.

Fate
U-170 surrendered in Horten Naval Base, Norway on 9 May 1945, and was transferred to Loch Ryan in Scotland. She was scuttled on 30 November 1945 as part of Operation Deadlight.

Summary of raiding history

References

Bibliography

External links

World War II submarines of Germany
German Type IX submarines
1942 ships
U-boats commissioned in 1942
U-boats sunk in 1945
Ships built in Bremen (state)
Maritime incidents in November 1945
Operation Deadlight